The 1975–76 Seattle SuperSonics season was the 9th season of the Seattle SuperSonics in the National Basketball Association (NBA). The SuperSonics finished the season in second place in the Western Conference with a 43–39 record, the same as the previous year and reached the playoffs for a second consecutive season, where they lost to the Phoenix Suns in the Conference Semifinals in six games.

Offseason

Draft picks

Note: only draft picks who participated in at least one game in the NBA are listed.

Roster

Depth chart

Regular season

Season standings

Record vs. opponents

Game log

|-bgcolor=#cfc
| 1
| October 24
| Portland
| W 105–97
| Fred Brown (29)
| || || Seattle Center Coliseum13,601
| 1–0

|-bgcolor=#cfc
| 2
| October 26
| Phoenix
| W 113–99
| Leonard Gray (27)
| || || Seattle Center Coliseum 13,288
| 2–0 

|-bgcolor=#fcc
| 3
| October 28
| @ Chicago
| L 90–101
|Slick Watts (28)
| || || Chicago Stadium 5,115
| 2–1 

|-bgcolor=#cfc
| 4
| October 29
| @ Kansas City
| W 92–91
|Bruce Seals (25)
| || || Kemper Arena 9,464
| 3–1 

|-bgcolor=#fcc
| 5
| October 31
| @ Los Angeles
| L 104–120
|Fred Brown (33)
| || || The Forum 12,118
| 3–2 

|-bgcolor=#fcc
| 6
| November 2
| Washington
| L 85–94
|Tommy Burleson (20)
| || || Seattle Center Coliseum 14,096
| 3–3 

|-bgcolor=#fcc
| 7
| November 5
| @ Detroit
| L 107–124
|Slick Watts (25)
| || || Cobo Arena 4,777
| 3–4 

|-bgcolor=#fcc
| 8
| November 6
| @ Washington
| L 100–110
|Fred Brown (29)
| || || Capital Centre 7,732
| 3–5 

|-bgcolor=#fcc
| 9
| November 8
| @ Atlanta
| L 94–107
|Fred Brown (24)
| || || Omni Coliseum 4,382
| 3–6 

|-bgcolor=#cfc
| 10
| November 9
| @ New Orleans
| W 111–97
|Fred Brown (41)
| || || Louisiana Superdome 13,472
| 4–6 

|-bgcolor=#fcc
| 11
| November 12
| Kansas City
| L  92–107
|Fred Brown (19)
| || || Seattle Center Coliseum 11,213
| 4–7 

|-bgcolor=#fcc
| 12
| November 13
| @ Phoenix
| L 103–106
|Bruce Seals (24)
| || || Arizona Veterans Memorial Coliseum 5,016
| 4–8 

|-bgcolor=#cfc
| 13
| November 14
| Cleveland
| W 100–97 (OT)
|Fred Brown (26)
| || || Seattle Center Coliseum 11,969
| 5–8 

|-bgcolor=#cfc
| 14
| November 16
| Golden State
| W 102–98
|Fred Brown (30)
| || || Seattle Center Coliseum 14,096
| 6–8 

|-bgcolor=#cfc
| 15
| November 19
| Chicago
| W 97–87
|Fred Brown (25)
| || || Seattle Center Coliseum 13,114
| 7–8 

|-bgcolor=#cfc
| 16
| November 23
| Milwaukee
| W 112–104
|Tommy Burleson (28)
| || || Seattle Center Coliseum 14,021
| 8–8 

|-bgcolor=#cfc
| 17
| November 25
| @ New York
| W 128–127 (OT)
|Tommy Burleson (35)
| || || Madison Square Garden 15,548
| 9–8 

|-bgcolor=#cfc
| 18
| November 26
| @ Boston
| W 110–109
|Fred Brown (30)
| || || Boston Garden 12,189
| 10–8 

|-bgcolor=#fcc
| 19
| November 28
| @ Philadelphia
| L 94–113
|Tommy Burleson (18)
| || || The Spectrum 13,674
| 10–9 

|-bgcolor=#fcc
| 20
| November 29
| @ Cleveland
| L 108–124
|Fred Brown (30)
| || || Coliseum at Richfield 10,151
| 10–10 

|-bgcolor=#cfc
| 21
| December 2
| @ Kansas City
| W 101–90
|Fred Brown (31)
| || || Kemper Arena 7,670
| 11–10 

|-bgcolor=#fcc
| 22
| December 3
| @ Houston
| L 101–107
|Bruce Seals (16)
| || || The Summit 5,374
| 11–11 

|-bgcolor=#fcc
| 23
| December 6
| @ Golden State
| L 94–104
|Fred Brown (17)
| || || Oakland–Alameda County Coliseum Arena 12,677
| 11–12 

|-bgcolor=#fcc
| 24
| December 7
| Golden State
| L 106–115
|Fred Brown, Slick Watts (22)
| || || Seattle Center Coliseum 14,096
| 11–13 

|-bgcolor=#cfc
| 25
| December 10
| Chicago
| W 99–79
|Fred Brown (17)
| || || Seattle Center Coliseum 12,471
| 12–13 

|-bgcolor=#cfc
| 26
| December 12
| Detroit
| W 97–95
|Fred Brown (27)
| || || Seattle Center Coliseum 12,859
| 13–13 

|-bgcolor=#cfc
| 27
| December 14
| Philadelphia
| W 114–105
|Fred Brown (31)
| || || Seattle Center Coliseum 14,096
| 14–13 

|-bgcolor=#fcc
| 28
| December 17
| Cleveland
| L 101–115
|Rod Derline (16)
| || || Seattle Center Coliseum 12,291
| 14–14 

|-bgcolor=#cfc
| 29
| December 19
| New Orleans
| W 113–102
|Herm Gilliam (24)
| || || Seattle Center Coliseum 11,427
| 15–14 

|-bgcolor=#fcc
| 30
| December 21
| Milwaukee
| L 101–103
|Mike Bantom (20)
| || || Seattle Center Coliseum 12,188
| 15–15 

|-bgcolor=#fcc
| 31
| December 23
| @ Portland
| L 100–125
|Tommy Burleson (23)
| || || Memorial Coliseum 8,610
| 15–16 

|-bgcolor=#cfc
| 32
| December 26
| Kansas City
| W 90–87
|Bruce Seals (21)
| || || Seattle Center Coliseum 13,673
| 16–16 

|-bgcolor=#fcc
| 33
| December 27
| Los Angeles
| L 100–109
|Tommy Burleson (25)
| || || Seattle Center Coliseum 14,096
| 16–17 

|-bgcolor=#cfc
| 34
| December 28
| Houston
| W 116–106
|Fred Brown (23)
| || || Seattle Center Coliseum 13,702
| 17–17 

|-bgcolor=#cfc
| 35
| December 30
| @ Los Angeles
| W 112–100
|Fred Brown (34)
| || || The Forum 12,740
| 18–17 

|-bgcolor=#fcc
| 36
| January 2
| Boston
| L 98–102
|Fred Brown (34)
| || || Seattle Center Coliseum 14,096
| 18–18 

|-bgcolor=#cfc
| 37
| January 4
| Golden State
| W 97–85
|Fred Brown (20)
| || || Seattle Center Coliseum 13,669
| 19–18 

|-bgcolor=#cfc
| 38
| January 7
| New York
| W 91–89
|Fred Brown (24)
| || || Seattle Center Coliseum 14,096
| 20–18 

|-bgcolor=#cfc
| 39
| January 9
| @ Phoenix
| W 112–110 (OT)
|Tommy Burleson (25)
| || || Arizona Veterans Memorial Coliseum 5,774
| 21–18 

|-bgcolor=#fcc
| 40
| January 11
| Buffalo
| L 104–125
|Leonard Gray (20)
| || || Seattle Center Coliseum 14,096
| 21–19 

|-bgcolor=#fcc
| 41
| January 13
| @ Milwaukee
| L 108–114
|Fred Brown (24)
| || || MECCA Arena10,496
| 21–20 

|-bgcolor=#cfc
| 42
| January 14
| @ Atlanta
| W 112–110
|Fred Brown (33)
| || || Omni Coliseum 4,376
| 22–20 

|-bgcolor=#fcc
| 43
| January 16
| @ Washington
| L 85–100
|Slick Watts (19)
| || || Capital Centre 9,425
| 22–21 

|-bgcolor=#fcc
| 44
| January 17
| @ Buffalo
| L 101–110
|Fred Brown (28)
| || || Buffalo Memorial Auditorium 8,469
| 22–22 

|-bgcolor=#fcc
| 45
| January 21
| @ Detroit
| L 104–111
|Fred Brown (26)
| || || Cobo Arena 3,612
| 22–23 

|-bgcolor=#fcc
| 46
| January 22
| @ Cleveland
| L 99–109
|Fred Brown (17)
| || || Coliseum at Richfield 5,102
| 22–24 

|-bgcolor=#fcc
| 47
| January 24
| @ Houston
| L 103–110
|Fred Brown (37)
| || || The Summit 5,027
| 22–25 

|-bgcolor=#fcc
| 48
| January 28
| @ Portland
| L 104–124
|Fred Brown (26)
| || || Memorial Coliseum 10,930
| 22–26 

|-bgcolor=#cfc
| 49
| January 30
| Washington
| W 123–100
|Fred Brown (29)
| || || Seattle Center Coliseum 14,096
| 23–26 

|-bgcolor=#fcc
| 50
| February 6
| Portland
| L 100–109
|Leonard Gray (32)
| || || Seattle Center Coliseum 13,419
| 23–27 

|-bgcolor=#fcc
| 51
| February 7
| @ Golden State
| L 100–127
|Tommy Burleson (26)
| || || Oakland–Alameda County Coliseum Arena 12,787
| 23–28 

|-bgcolor=#fcc
| 52
| February 8
| Phoenix
| L 101–107 (OT)
|Tommy Burleson (33)
| || || Seattle Center Coliseum 13,039
| 23–29 

|-bgcolor=#cfc
| 53
| February 11
| New Orleans
| W 93–90
|Tommy Burleson (25)
| || || Seattle Center Coliseum 13,595
| 24–29 

|-bgcolor=#cfc
| 54
| February 13
| Atlanta
| W 119–102
|Tommy Burleson, Herm Gilliam (20)
| || || Seattle Center Coliseum 13,925
| 25–29 

|-bgcolor=#cfc
| 55
| February 14
| @ Portland
| W 122–108
|Bruce Seals (29)
| || || Memorial Coliseum 11,347
| 26–29 

|-bgcolor=#cfc
| 56
| February 15
| Detroit
| W 109–107
|Herm Gilliam (22)
| || || Seattle Center Coliseum 13,728
| 27–29 

|-bgcolor=#cfc
| 57
| February 18
| Boston
| W 124–99
|Fred Brown (29)
| || || Seattle Center Coliseum 14,096
| 28–29 

|-bgcolor=#cfc
| 58
| February 20
| Philadelphia
| W 111–92
|Fred Brown (26)
| || || Seattle Center Coliseum 14,096
| 29–29 

|-bgcolor=#cfc
| 59
| February 22
| Los Angeles
| W 97–91
|Fred Brown (27)
| || || Seattle Center Coliseum 14,096
| 30–29 

|-bgcolor=#cfc
| 60
| February 25
| @ Buffalo
| W 126–94
|Fred Brown (31)
| || || Buffalo Memorial Auditorium 8,691
| 31–29 

|-bgcolor=#fcc
| 61
| February 27
| @ Boston
| L 118–122
|Fred Brown (33)
| || || Boston Garden 15,320
| 31–30 

|-bgcolor=#fcc
| 62
| February 29
| @ Philadelphia
| L 115–130
|Fred Brown (23)
| || || The Spectrum 11,649
| 31–31 

|-bgcolor=#cfc
| 63
| March 2
| @ New York
| W 109–105
|Bruce Seals (29)
| || || Madison Square Garden 14,227
| 32–31 

|-bgcolor=#fcc
| 64
| March 3
| @ Detroit
| L 110–114
|Fred Brown (24)
| || || Cobo Arena 3,096
| 32–32 

|-bgcolor=#fcc
| 65
| March 5
| @ Kansas City
| L 93–111
|Fred Brown (17)
| || || Kemper Arena 5,852
| 32–33 

|-bgcolor=#fcc
| 66
| March 7
| @ New Orleans
| L 106–124
|Leonard Gray (16)
| || || Louisiana Superdome 8,008
| 32–34 

|-bgcolor=#fcc
| 67
| March 9
| @ Chicago
| L 101–102
|Fred Brown (26)
| || || Chicago Stadium 4,614
| 32–35 

|-bgcolor=#cfc
| 68
| March 10
| @ Milwaukee
| W 110–105
|Fred Brown (26)
| || || MECCA Arena9,587
| 33–35 

|-bgcolor=#cfc
| 69
| March 14
| New York
| W 113–103
|Fred Brown (20)
| || || Seattle Center Coliseum 14,096
| 34–35 

|-bgcolor=#cfc
| 70
| March 17
| Buffalo
| W 122–111
|Fred Brown (37)
| || || Seattle Center Coliseum 14,096
| 35–35 

|-bgcolor=#cfc
| 71
| March 21
| Houston
| W 117–107
|Fred Brown, Tommy Burleson (24)
| || || Seattle Center Coliseum 14,096
| 36–35 

|-bgcolor=#fcc
| 72
| March 23
| @ Phoenix
| L 97–104
|Fred Brown (32)
| || || Arizona Veterans Memorial Coliseum 7,589
| 36–36 

|-bgcolor=#cfc
| 73
| March 24
| Milwaukee
| W 135–110
|Bruce Seals (27)
| || || Seattle Center Coliseum 14,096
| 37–36 

|-bgcolor=#cfc
| 74
| March 28
| Atlanta
| W 127–112
|Fred Brown (27)
| || || Seattle Center Coliseum 14,096
| 38–36 

|-bgcolor=#cfc
| 75
| March 31
| Los Angeles
| W 120–109
|Fred Brown, Herm Gilliam (22)
| || || Seattle Center Coliseum 14,096
| 39–36 

|-bgcolor=#fcc
| 76
| April 2
| @ Los Angeles
| L 105–113
|Tommy Burleson (32)
| || || The Forum 10,784
| 39–37 

|-bgcolor=#fcc
| 77
| April 3
| @ Golden State
| L 115–130
|Willie Norwood (20)
| || || Oakland–Alameda County Coliseum Arena 12,787
| 39–38 

|-bgcolor=#cfc
| 78
| April 4
| Phoenix
| W 117–89
|Fred Brown (33)
| || || Seattle Center Coliseum 14,096
| 40–38 

|-bgcolor=#cfc
| 79
| April 7
| Chicago
| W 115–114
|Willie Norwood (24)
| || || Seattle Center Coliseum 14,096
| 41–38 

|-bgcolor=#cfc
| 80
| April 9
| Golden State
| W 119–103
|Fred Brown (26)
| || || Seattle Center Coliseum 14,096
| 42–38 

|-bgcolor=#fcc
| 81
| April 10
| @ Phoenix
| L 95–121
|Herm Gilliam (22)
| || || Arizona Veterans Memorial Coliseum 9,577
| 42–39 

|-bgcolor=#cfc
| 82
| April 11
| Portland
| W 132–131
|Fred Brown (33)
| || || Seattle Center Coliseum 14,096
| 43–39

Playoffs

|- align="center" bgcolor="#ccffcc"
| 1
| April 13
| Phoenix
| W 102–99
| Fred Brown (34)
| Fred Brown (7)
| Slick Watts (8)
| Seattle Center Coliseum12,408
| 1–0
|- align="center" bgcolor="#ffcccc"
| 2
| April 15
| Phoenix
| L 111–116
| Fred Brown (45)
| Tommy Burleson (12)
| Slick Watts (6)
| Seattle Center Coliseum14,096
| 1–1
|- align="center" bgcolor="#ffcccc"
| 3
| April 18
| @ Phoenix
| L 91–103
| Slick Watts (18)
| three players tied (8)
| Slick Watts (7)
| Arizona Veterans Memorial Coliseum13,036
| 1–2
|- align="center" bgcolor="#ffcccc"
| 4
| April 20
| @ Phoenix
| L 114–130
| Fred Brown (33)
| Tommy Burleson (20)
| Herm Gilliam (7)
| Arizona Veterans Memorial Coliseum13,036
| 1–3
|- align="center" bgcolor="#ccffcc"
| 5
| April 25
| Phoenix
| W 114–108
| Bruce Seals (28)
| Willie Norwood (13)
| Slick Watts (12)
| Seattle Center Coliseum14,096
| 2–3
|- align="center" bgcolor="#ffcccc"
| 6
| April 24
| @ Phoenix
| L 112–123
| Seals, Watts (24)
| Bruce Seals (7)
| Slick Watts (11)
| Arizona Veterans Memorial Coliseum13,192
| 2–4

Player statistics

Season

Playoffs

Awards and records
 Slick Watts led the league in totals in assists and steals, as well as assists per game and was selected to the NBA All-Defensive First Team. He was also presented with the J. Walter Kennedy Citizenship Award.
 Fred Brown made his first All-Star appearance at the 1976 NBA All-Star Game.

Transactions

Overview

Trades

References

Seattle SuperSonics seasons
Seattle